Bethwell Allan Ogot (born 1929) is a historian from Kenya.  He specialises in African history, research methods and theory. One of his works starts by saying that "to tell the story of a past so as to portray an inevitable destiny is, for humankind, a need as universal as tool-making. To that extent, we may say that a human being is, by nature, historicus.

He was the Chancellor of Moi University up to early 2013.

Biography
Ogot, a Kenyan Luo, was born in Gem Location of Siaya County of Kenya. In 1959 he married Grace Emily Akinyi, a politician, writer and health specialist. She eventually served the government of Kenya as an Assistant Minister for Culture and Social Services.

He was educated at Ambira, Maseno School,  Makerere University College, and the University of St Andrews and the School of Oriental and African Studies, University of London. While studying in London, he served as a leader of the Kenya Students Association, where he assisted the Kenya nationalists, notably the late Jaramogi Oginga Odinga during the 1960 negotiations at the Lancaster negotiations for Kenya's independence.

Ogot commenced his university academic and research life as lecturer at the Makerere University, and eventually became Chairman of the History Department of University College, Nairobi, currently the University of Nairobi (UoN). At the UoN he founded and directed the Institute of Development Studies (IDS) and the Institute of African Studies (IAS). He also served as the Dean, School of Arts and Social Sciences and Deputy Vice-Chancellor Academics therein. He was the President of the International Scientific Committee for the preparation of UNESCO's General History of Africa. He edited Volume V of UNESCO's History of Africa, and presided over the committee that oversaw the production of the entire History. He was a member of the International Commission for UNESCO's History of Humanity.

From the University of Nairobi, Ogot was appointed by President Jomo Kenyatta to serve as member of the East African Community (EAC) Legislative Assembly, between 1975 and 1977. He was President of the PanAfrican Archaeological Association from 1977 to 1983. Between 1978 and 1980 Ogot served at the International Louis Leakey Memorial Institute for African Pre-History (TILLMIAP), which was an integral part of the National Museums of Kenya (NMK), as its first director. He served Kenyatta University as Professor, and the Kenya Post and Telecommunications as chairman. He was the Chancellor of Moi University, Eldoret, up to 2013. He remains Professor Emeritus of Maseno University, where prior to being Chancellor of Moi University he had been the Director of Post-Graduate Studies.

As the Chancellor of Moi University, he worked tirelessly with President Kibaki, the Ministry of Higher Education of Kenya, Professors David Some and Richard Mibey as Vice-Chancellors and Samuel Gudu, Margarete Kamar and Bob Wishitemi to oversee the constitution of the Masinde Muliro University of Science and Technology, Narok University, Karatina University, Kabianga University, University of Eldoret, Rongo University College and the Odera Akango’ College, which remains a constituent college of Moi University.

Criticism
Kiboyye Okoth-Yogo who writes on subjugationism as theory of legal history also proffers a critical analysis of his authorship that touches on the pacification of the African as colonial and the post colonial reality.

Honours and accolades
 Distinguished Africanist Award (2001) of the African Studies Association, presented annually in recognition of a lifetime of notable service to African studies.
 UNESCO's Gold Medal
 Averos Medal
 Elder of the Burning Spears (EBS)
 Hon.D.Litt of Kenyatta University
 In 2012, the African Studies Association (ASA) established the Bethwell A. Ogot Book Prize, an annual award given at the ASA meeting to the author of the best book on East African Studies
 Grieve Prize in Moral Philosophy from the University of St Andrews.

Selected works

Editor, East Africa, Past and Present, 1964.
 With F. B. Welbourn, A Place to Feel at Home, 1966. (A study of two independent churches in western Kenya)
 History of the Southern Luo: Volume I, Migration and Settlement, 1500–1900 (Series: Peoples of East Africa), East African Publishing House, Nairobi, 1967. (Apparently Vol II never published)
 Editor, with J. A. Kieran, Zamani: A Survey of East African History (Nairobi: East African Publishing House Ltd, 1968. Reprint with corrections, 1969. 
 Editor, Politics and Nationalism in Colonial Kenya: Proceedings of the 1971 Conference of the Historical Association of Kenya – HADITH 4, Nairobi: East African Publishing House), 1971
 Editor, with William R. Ochieng', Decolonization and Independence in Kenya, 1940–93, London: James Currey, 1995, .
 Building on the Indigenous: Selected Essays 1981–1998. Kisumu: Anyange Press, 1999
 Editors, with Toyin Falola and E. S. Atieno Odhiambo, The Challenges of History and Leadership in Africa: The Essays of Bethwell Allan Ogot (Trenton and Asmara: Africa World Press, 2002. .
 History as Destiny and History as Knowledge: Being Reflections on the Problems of Historicity and Historiography. Kisumu: Anyange Press, 2005
 My Footprints on the Sands of Time: An Autobiography, Trafford Publishing, 2006. 
 A History of the Luo-Speaking Peoples of East Africa. Kisumu: Anyange Press, 2009
 Liberty or Death: Southern Sudan's March to Independence. Nairobi: The Regal Press Kenya Ltd, 2010.
 Who, if Anyone Owns the Past? Reflections on the Meaning of "Public History". Kisumu: Anyange Press, 2010.
 My Footprints on the Sands of Time: An Autobiography. Kisumu: Anyange Press, 2011.

See also 
 Luo people of Kenya and Tanzania

References

1929 births
Living people
Kenyan historians
Kenyan Luo people
Academic staff of the University of Nairobi
Academic staff of Makerere University
Makerere University alumni
Alumni of the University of St Andrews
Alumni of SOAS University of London
People associated with Moi University
20th-century historians
21st-century historians
20th-century Kenyan writers
21st-century Kenyan writers
Kenyan essayists
Academic staff of Kenyatta University
Academic staff of Maseno University